Nizhniye Balmazy (Tübänge Balmaźı) is a rural locality (a village) in Karaidelsky Selsoviet, Karaidelsky District, Bashkortostan, Russia. The population was 221 as of 2010. There are 4 streets.

Geography 
Nizhniye Balmazy is located 10 km northeast of Karaidel (the district's administrative centre) by road. Urazbakhty is the nearest rural locality.

References 

Rural localities in Karaidelsky District